Helicodonta, common name the "cheese snail", is a species of air-breathing land snail, a terrestrial pulmonate gastropod mollusk in the subfamily Helicodontinae of the family Helicodontidae. 

The common name is based on the shape of the shell, which is reminiscent of a wheel of cheese.

Species
Species within the genus Helicodonta include:
 Helicodonta angigyra (Rossmässler, 1834)
 Helicodonta langhofferi Wagner, 1912
 Helicodonta obvoluta (Müller, 1774)
 Helicodonta wilhelminae Maassen, 1991
Species brought into synonymy
 Helicodonta gyria (J. R. Roth, 1839) : synonym of Lindholmiola gyria (J. R. Roth, 1839) (unaccepted combination)
 Helicodonta hispanica Gude, 1910 : synonym of Suboestophora hispanica (Gude, 1910) (original combination)
 Helicodonta involuta (Thomä, 1845) † : synonym of Protodrepanostoma involutum (Thomä, 1845) † (new combination)
 Helicodonta planorbiformis (Sacco, 1886) † : synonym of Protodrepanostoma planorbiforme (Sacco, 1886) †
 Helicodonta sculpturata Gray, 1838 : synonym of Sculptaria sculpturata (Gray, 1838) (original combination)

References

 Bank, R. A. (2017). Classification of the Recent terrestrial Gastropoda of the World. Last update: July 16th, 2017
 Zilch, A. (1959-1960). Gastropoda. Teil 2. Euthyneura. In: O.H. Schindewolf (ed.), Handbuch der Paläozoologie, 6 (2, 1): 1-200 (17 July 1959); (2, 2): 201-400 (25 November 1959); (2, 3): 401-600 (30 March 1960); (2, 4): 601-834, I-XII (15 August 1960). Berlin (Borntraeger).

External links
 Held, F. (1837-1838). Notizen über die Weichthiere Bayerns. Isis (Oken), 30 (4): 303-309 (1837); 30 (12): 901-919 (1838). Leipzig
 Fitzinger, L.J. (1833). Systematisches Verzeichniß der im Erzherzogthume Oesterreich vorkommenden Weichthiere, als Prodrom einer Fauna derselben. Beiträge zur Landeskunde Oesterreichs's unter der Enns, 3: 88-122. Wien
 Férussac, A.E.J.P.F. d'Audebard de. (1821-1822). Tableaux systématiques des animaux mollusques classés en familles naturelles, dans lesquels on a établi la concordance de tous les systèmes; suivis d'un Prodrome général pour tous les mollusques ou fluviatiles, vivantes ou fossiles. Paris, 1821 et 1822.
 Beck, H. (1837). Index molluscorum praesentis aevi musei principis augustissimi Christiani Frederici. 1-124. Hafniae

Helicodontidae